Avenue C is a north-south avenue located in the Alphabet City area of the East Village neighborhood of Manhattan, New York City, east of Avenue B and west of Avenue D. It is also known as Loisaida Avenue. It starts at South Street, proceeding north as Montgomery Street and Pitt Street, before intersecting East Houston Street and assuming its proper name. Avenue C ends at 23rd Street, running nearly underneath the FDR Drive from 18th Street. North of 14th Street the road forms the eastern boundary of Stuyvesant Town and Peter Cooper Village. A melting pot of people, culture and style.

History and description

Avenue C was designated Loisaida Avenue in 1987, in recognition of the Puerto Rican heritage of the neighborhood. Loisaida is Spanglish and is pronounced   (Lower East Side). The history of the neighborhood was described in the book Selling The Lower East Side. Although the East Village designation of this area has received widespread acceptance, many longtime Loisaida residents still consider it part of the Lower East Side, as evidenced by the public art found on the buildings along Avenue C.

At the corner of Loisaida and 9th Street, there are two sizable (by Manhattan standards) community gardens that are maintained by the surrounding community. Their hours vary with the season and ability of their volunteers, but they are open to everyone and there is no admission fee. The famous punk house C-Squat sits at another corner of 9th Street. The Museum of Reclaimed Urban Space, which opened in 2012, is located at C-Squat.

Avenue C is served by the M9, the M14D SBS, and the M23 SBS New York City Bus routes.

A bicycle lane has existed on the Avenue since 1999, and was recently repainted after Avenue C was repaved. It is now a buffered lane for the majority of its route and has been extended to nearly the full length of the avenue.

Landmarks
The Public National Bank Building at 106 Avenue C at the corner of East 7th Street (also known as 231 East 7th Street) was built in 1923 as a branch bank, and was designed by Eugene Schoen, a noted advocate of modernism at the time. The Public National Bank was a New York State-based bank, and Schoen designed a number of branches for them. This building was sold in 1954, and turned into a nursing home with the addition of a third story. It was converted to residential use in the 1980s.

References
Notes

External links

 Selling The Lower East Side
 New York Songlines: Avenue C, a virtual walking tour
 Museum of Reclaimed Urban Space

C